The Big Shoulders Fund is a Chicago-based 501(c)(3) nonprofit organization designed to offer financial support to low-income Catholic schools throughout the city.  Founded in 1986 by Cardinal Joseph Bernardin and a group of Chicago businessmen, the organization has a Four Star Rating from Charity Navigator and in 2008 became a member of the FADICA.

Mission
The mission of the Big Shoulders fund is to provide assistance to Catholic elementary and high schools in Chicago's low-income communities.  The funds raised by Big Shoulders are given to its schools to support a variety of educational mediums including scholarships, special education programming, instructional equipment, facility improvements, faculty development, and operating grants.

Charity 
In January 2020, The Big Shoulders Fund has spent $47.5 million as well as the archdiocese providing $44.9 million to 30 Catholic schools based mainly on Chicago's western and southern sides.

In June 2020, On the occasion of Father's Day afflicted by the COVID-19 pandemic, volunteers delivered 10,000 meals through 10 separate locations across Northwest Indiana.

Statistics

Schools

The Big Shoulders Fund serves schools that meet the following criteria:
 the school is located in the City of Chicago
 the school qualifies for and participates in Title I funding
 20 percent or more of students attending the school receive free or reduced lunch

Students
 The Big Shoulders Fund works with 76 elementary schools and 17 high schools
 These schools serve nearly 25,000 students
 80 percent of students at Big Shoulders Fund schools are racial minorities
 54 percent of students live at or below the federal poverty level
 32 percent of students come from families that are not Catholic

References

External links
 Big Shoulders Fund website
 Chicago Catholic Schools
 Big Shoulders Fund profile on Charity Navigator
 Big Shoulders Fund profile on the Samaritan Guide
 Big Shoulders Fund profile on Guidestar

Educational charities based in the United States
Non-profit organizations based in Chicago
Organizations established in 1986
1986 establishments in Illinois
Catholic charities
Charities based in Illinois
Christian charities based in the United States